The Provincial Executive Committees (PECs) of the African National Congress (ANC) are the chief executive organs of the party's nine provincial branches. Comprising the so-called “Top Five” provincial officials and up to 30 additional elected members, each is structured similarly to the party's National Executive Committee (NEC) and is elected every four years at party provincial conferences.

The “Top Five” officials at the head of each PEC are the ANC Provincial Chairperson, the political leader of the party in the province; the ANC Provincial Secretary, a full-time party functionary; their respective deputies; and the Provincial Treasurer. With some notable exceptions, especially under President Thabo Mbeki, the Provincial Chairperson often becomes the ANC's candidate for election as Premier in the corresponding provincial government, and other members of the PEC are often appointed to the provincial cabinet as Members of the Executive Council.

Structure and election 
Since its early history in the 1910s, the African National Congress (ANC) has had a quasi-federal structure, with an organisational hierarchy of local branches, regions, and provinces all falling under the overall leadership of the party's national executive. In its contemporary incarnation, the precise form of this hierarchy dates to the mid-1990s, when the party – recently unbanned by the apartheid government and returned from exile to South Africa – was restructured to align with the post-apartheid South African political system. The party therefore developed nine provincial branches which correspond to the nine provinces of South Africa. In each province, the ANC is led by a Provincial Executive Committee (PEC), which is described in the party's constitution as the party's "highest organ" in that province; the PECs are similar in structure (though inferior) to the party's National Executive Committee (PEC).

In terms of the constitution, the PECs' functions include policy implementation, management of provincial party funds, and selection of provincial party candidates for government elections. Each PEC may also supervise and direct all ANC organs in its province, including local and regional party branches and ANC caucuses in provincial and local governments. Much of a PEC's day-to-day work is carried out by the Provincial Working Committee, which the PEC elects from among its members at the beginning of each term.

Each PEC itself comprises no more than 35 elected members, including five officials. These are elected by secret ballot at a regular provincial conference, analogous to the party's national conference, attended by delegates who represent each of the local party branches in the province. In recent years, a PEC's constitutional term is four years, so each province is required to hold a conference at least every four years. PEC members are required to have been ANC members in good standing for at least seven years and, in line with the ANC's policy of applying internal gender quotas, at least half of every PEC's members must be women. In addition, the party constitution provides for some unelected persons to sit on the PECs: the leader(s) of each region in the province are represented as ex officio members, as are the provincial leaders of the ANC's three leagues (the Women's League, the Youth League, and the Veterans' League); each elected PEC may also co-opt up to three additional members to ensure "balanced representation". The size and term of the PECs have varied since 1994 with constitutional amendments: under the 1997 ANC constitution, for example, PECs comprised no more than 18 elected members serving three-year terms.

In terms of the party constitution, PECs are ultimately subordinate to the NEC, which must ensure that they function "democratically and effectively" and which may suspend or dissolve any PEC "where necessary". This provision is commonly applied during factional crises, particularly when this means that the affected province is not able to hold its conference timeously and the PEC exceeds its four-year term. If a PEC is disbanded, the constitution prescribes that a new PEC must be elected within nine months and that the NEC must appoint "an interim structure" – commonly referred to as a provincial task team – to lead the province until then. In practice, this nine-month deadline is not always met; in the Western Cape, for example, an unelected task team installed in 2019 still controlled the province in 2022.

Top Five officials 
Each PEC is led by the so-called "Top Five" officials in the province, who are elected with the rest of the PEC at the provincial conference. These are the chairperson, deputy chairperson, secretary, deputy secretary, and treasurer. The Top Five is analogous to the NEC's Top Six, with the provincial chairperson and deputy chairperson positions corresponding to the national presidency and deputy presidency, but with no provincial position corresponding to the national chairmanship.

The provincial chairperson is therefore the provincial party leader, responsible for overall political leadership of the province. The provincial secretary position is also highly influential. A full-time salaried ANC functionary, the provincial secretary is responsible, among other things, for auditing and verifying local ANC branches, a process which often has significant import for the outcomes of provincial and national conferences. In the past, the support of provincial chairpersons and secretaries has been decisive for the candidacies of national leaders – as was arguably the case with the election of Jacob Zuma as ANC president at the 52nd National Conference in 2007 and the election of Cyril Ramaphosa at the 54th National Conference in 2017.

Each provincial chairperson and secretary is also an ex officio member of the NEC. However, any ANC member who is directly elected or co-opted onto the NEC cannot take up his seat unless he resigns from any subnational offices he holds in the ANC. In the past, the party constitution allowed for exceptions in "extraordinary circumstances"; Jacob Zuma claimed that this provision was written to allow him to serve simultaneously as national chairperson and KwaZulu-Natal provincial chairperson, which he did from 1994 to 1998.

"Two centres of power" 
In most phases of South Africa's post-apartheid history, it has been typical for the provincial chairperson of the ANC to become the ANC's candidate for the premiership, the head of the provincial executive, in the government of their respective province. Each premier is indirectly elected by the provincial legislature, but ANC legislative caucuses take their instructions from the party; the premier in turn has the power to appoint his provincial cabinet, the Executive Council, and typically appoints colleagues from the ANC PEC as provincial ministers. These norms are "a matter of stated convention not embedded in the law but consistent with it", and have historically been controversial within the ANC and in broader society.

Pursuant to South Africa's first democratic election in 1994, the ANC won power and formed a government in all but two of the country's new provinces. During this period, the national leadership of the ANC, under president Nelson Mandela, sought to link the position of provincial party chairperson with the position of premier, arguing that the linkage would strengthen local democracy, as local members of the ANC (at that time the majority party in most provinces) would thereby have greater participation in selecting their premiers. In practice, however, the national ANC achieved this linkage not by foregoing control over the selection of premiers but by extending its control over the selection of party chairpersons: in the early and mid-1990s, the national ANC expended much energy persuading and negotiating with local members and leaders to have their preferred premier candidates elected as provincial chairs. After the 1994 election, only two ANC members – Raymond Mhlaba in the Eastern Cape and Mosuioa Lekota in the Free State – became premier in their respective provinces without winning election to the party chairmanship. Both Mhlaba and Lekota were given "special attention" by the national leadership, who lobbied for their election to the NEC at the party's 49th National Conference in December 1994.

In 1998, the NEC – then led by Thabo Mbeki, who had been elected ANC president in 1997 – endorsed a formal proposal to "delink" the positions of provincial chairperson and premier. Provincial chairpersons would no longer automatically become the ANC's presumptive candidates for the premiership. Mbeki explained that the ANC was "more concerned with the ability to run the provincial administration than the popularity of the individual". In the next general elections in 1999 and 2004, which also saw Mbeki elected as president of South Africa, this new policy was applied and was generally extremely poorly received within the ANC: members and subnational leaders resented what they perceived as "the imposition of relative outsiders as premiers". In the Free State, for example, supporters of longstanding ANC provincial chairperson Ace Magashule battled with a series of premiers viewed as Mbeki acolytes. The ANC and national media began to debate the so-called "two centres of power" theory, which held that the delinkage had created two centres of power in each province, one in the party and one in the state, which led to tensions within the party and undermined the efficacy and cohesiveness of governance by the state. In later years, Mbeki called this argument "faulty", said it had been "cooked up in order to achieve particular objectives", and defended his policy as necessary to entrench the separation of party and state.

Although the "two centres of power" notion originated to explain subnational discord in the ANC, the debate was applied to national politics when it became clear that Mbeki intended to run for a third president as ANC president in 2007 even though the national Constitution precluded his running for another term as national president. Those who opposed Mbeki's re-election argued that it would create two centres of power in the national ANC and would therefore be disruptive. At the 52nd National Conference in 2007, Mbeki lost his re-election bid to Jacob Zuma, who set about restoring the ANC as the single so-called centre of power, facilitated by resolutions taken at the same conference: the conference formally resolved that henceforth the ANC president would be the ANC's candidate for national president and that premiers would be selected by the NEC from a list of three names submitted by the province's PEC.

List of current leaders 
The current chairpersons of the ANC's nine provinces are:

 Free State: Mxolisi Dukwana (2023–)
 KwaZulu-Natal: Siboniso Duma (2022–)
 North West: Nono Maloyi (2022–)
 Mpumalanga: Mandla Ndlovu (acting 2018–2022, elected 2022–)
 Gauteng: Panyaza Lesufi (2022–)
 Eastern Cape: Oscar Mabuyane (2017–)
 Western Cape: None (PEC dissolved in 2019)
 Northern Cape: Zamani Saul (2017–)
 Limpopo: Stan Mathabatha (2014–)

List of former leaders 
In 2005, Edna Molewa of the North West became the first woman to hold a provincial chairmanship in the ANC; she remained the only woman to do so as of 2022. As of 2022, Ace Magashule held the party's record for longest tenure as provincial chairperson; he led the Free State province from 1998 to 2017, although during that period the NEC dissolved his PEC and replaced it with an interim body on more than one occasion. When the national executive takes this recourse, the term of the Top Five officials also end and the province is led by an unelected task team convenor rather than an elected chairperson.

Free State

KwaZulu-Natal 

The 20 additional members of the KwaZulu-Natal PEC as elected in 2012 were Senzo Mchunu, Siyabonga Cwele, Ina Cronje, Bheki Ntuli, Ntombikayise Sibhidla-Saphetha, Lydia Johnson, Ravi Pillay, Mildred Oliphant, Lungi Gcabashe, Jabu Khumalo, Mthandeni Dlungwane, Nomvuzo Shabalala, Ester Qwabe, Hlengiwe Mavimbela, Mxolisi Kaunda, Bongi Sithole, Senzo Mkhize, Lindiwe Njoko, Sipho Gcabashe, and Nigel Gumede.

The 30 additional members elected in 2015 (and removed in 2018) were Fikile Khumalo, Bheki Mtolo, Mervyn Dirks, Lydia Johnson, Makhosi Zungu, Nomagugu Simelane-Zulu, Weziwe Thusi, Duduzile Mazibuko, Nontembeko Boyce, Celiwe Madlopha, Maggie Govender, Makhoni Ntuli, Khulani Hadebe, Mkhawuleni Khumalo, Vincent Madlala, Siphindile Zondi, Arthur Zwane, Zanele Nyawo, Jabu Khumalo, Bongi Sithole-Moloi, Senzo Mkhize, Sipho Gcabashe, Mxolisi Kaunda, Sduduzo Gumede, Mdumiseni Ntuli, Meshack Radebe, Lindiwe Mjobo, Ravi Pillay, Phumzile Zulu, and Ester Qwabe.

The 30 additional members elected in 2022 were Peggy Nkonyeni, Mdumiseni Ntuli, Nomusa Dube-Ncube, Nonhlanhla Khoza, Nhlakanipho Ntombela, Super Zuma, Nomakiki Majola, Nobuhle Nkabane, Bheki Ntuli, Nolubabalo Mthembu, Ndodephethe Mthethwa, Sizophila Mkhize, Mafika Mndebele, Khonza Ngidi, Jomo Sibiya, Celiwe Madlopha, Sbongile Khathi, Ntobeko Boyce, Makhosi Zungu, Londolo Zungu, Masenti Myeni, Kwazi Mshengu, Mxolisi Kaunda, Mbali Frazer, Bongi Moloi, Amanda Mapena, Mzi Zuma, Zinhle Cele and Tholi Gwala.

North West

Mpumalanga

Gauteng 

The 30 additional members of the Gauteng PEC as elected in 2018 were Ntombi Mekgwe, Khusela Diko, Kgosientso Ramokgopa, Lebogang Maile, Matome Chiloane, Boyce Maneli, Robert Mashego, Bandile Masuku, Rebecca Digamela, Tasneem Motara, Judith Tshabalala, Refiloe Kekana, Pretty Xaba, Mapiti Matsena, Bones Modise, Lindiwe Lasindwa, Dolly Ledwaba, Ezra Letsoalo, Peace Mabe, Dipuo Mvelase, Tshilidzi Munyai, Qedani Mahlangu, Kedibone Diale, Mbali Hlophe, Nomvuyo Mhlakaza, Mzi Khumalo, Morakane Mosupyoe, Hope Papo, Brian Hlongwa, and Gogo Ndlovana.

The 30 additional members of the Gauteng PEC as elected in 2022 were Bandile Masuku, Lebogang Maile, Mbali Hlophe, Nomathemba Mokgethi, Matome Chiloane, Nomvuyo Mhlakaza, Mzi Khumalo, Paul Mojapelo, Tebogo Letsie, Ntombi Mekgwe, Peace Mabe, Khusela Diko, Kedibone Diale, Nathi Congwane, Nonceba Molwele, Greg Schneemann, Judith Tshabalala, Joyce Boshomane, Vuyo Mhaga, Lesego Makhubela, Honours Mukhari, Thulani Ndlovu, Bones Modise, Ezra Letsoalo, Tshilidzi Munyai, Jane Mananiso, Pretty Xaba, Andiswa Mosai, Rebecca Digamela, and Gogo Ndlovana.

Eastern Cape 

The 30 additional members of the Eastern Cape PEC as elected in 2022 were Fundile Gade, Bukiwe Fanta, Nonceba Kontsiwe, Nqabisa Gantsho, Loyiso Magqashela, Stella Ndabeni-Abrahams, Nomakhosazana Meth, Xolile Nqatha, Lindelwa Dunjwa, Lindiwe Gunuza, Sixolile Mehlomakhulu, Sisisi Tolashe, William Ngozi, Nanziwe Rulashe, Yanga Zicina, Nonkqubela Pieters, Virginia Camealio-Benjamin, Clara Yekiso, Avela Mjajubana, Sindile Toni, Thandekile Sabisa, Siphokazi Mani-Lusithi, Nozibele Nyalambisa, Thokozile Sokanyile, Nontuthuzelo Maqubela, Mthetheleli Sam, Nomhle Sango, Siyabulela Zangqa, Mpumelelo Khuzwayo, and Andile Lungisa.

Western Cape

Northern Cape

Limpopo 

The 30 additional members of the Limpopo PEC as elected in 2018 were Dickson Masemola, Phophi Ramathuba, Thabo Mokone, Rodgers Monama, Jerry Ndou, Nkakareng Rakgoale, Falaza Mdaka, Polly Boshielo, Mapula Mokaba, Seaparo Sekoati, Donald Selamolela, Joshua Matlou, Tolly Mashamaite, Nandi Ndalane, Thandi Moraka, Lehlogonolo Masoga, Kennedy Tshivase, Simon Mathe, Rudolph Phala, Rosinah Mogotlane, Sarah Lamola, Violet Mathye, Mavhungu Lerule-Ramakhanya, Makoma Makhurupetje, Johanna Aphiri, Andrina Matsimela, Lilliet Mamaregane, Maria Thamaga, Monicca Mochadi and Caroline Mahasela.

The 30 additional members of the Limpopo PEC as elected in 2022 were Phophi Ramathuba, Makoma Makhurupetje, Thabo Mokone, Mavhungu Lerule-Ramakhanya, Rodgers Monama,  Nkakareng Rakgoale, Jimmy Machaka, Falaza Mdaka, Simon Mathe, Morris Mataboge, Bella Kupa, Kate Bilankulu, Mapula Mokaba, Caroline Mahasela, Mpho Mudau, Maria Thamaga, Essop Mokgonyana, Jeremiah Ngobeni, Violet Mathye, Rosemary Molapo, Cherries Pokane, Kedibone Lebea, Reggie Mokokomme, Solomon Pheedi, Kathutshelo Netshifefe, Soviet Lekganyane, Frans Mokwele, Khumbudzo Ntshavheni, Maropene Ramokgopa and Sunny Dlovu.

See also 

 History of the African National Congress
 National Executive Committee of the African National Congress
 Presidents of the African National Congress Women's League
 Presidents of the African National Congress Youth League
 Step-aside rule

References 

African National Congress